is the 7th single by the Japanese girl idol group Berryz Kobo. It was released in Japan on June 8, 2005, and debuted at number 5 in the daily Oricon singles chart and at number 13 in the weekly Oricon singles chart.

The title song was used as an ending theme in the Kids Station anime .

Track listings

CD single 
  
 
 "Nanchū Koi wo Yatterū You Know?" (Instrumental)

DVD single "Nanchū Koi o Yatterū You Know?" Single V 
 "Nanchū Koi wo Yatterū You Know?"
 "Nanchū Koi wo Yatterū You Know?" (Dance Shot Ver.)

Charts

References

External links 
 
 Profile of the corresponding DVD single on the Up-Front Works official website

2005 singles
2005 songs
Japanese-language songs
Berryz Kobo songs
Songs written by Tsunku
Piccolo Town singles
Japanese synth-pop songs
Torch songs
Song recordings produced by Tsunku